Mainstream may refer to:

Film 
 Mainstream (film), a 2020 American film

Literature 
 Mainstream (fanzine), a science fiction fanzine
 Mainstream Publishing, a Scottish publisher
 Mainstream, a 1943 book by Hamilton Basso

Music 
 Mainstream jazz, a term coined in the 1950s to describe the form of jazz which was a continuation of the Swing era
 Mainstream (band), a late-1990s British shoegazer band, or their first album
 Mainstream (Fullerton College Jazz Band album), 1994
 Mainstream (Lloyd Cole and the Commotions album), 1987
 Mainstream (Quiet Sun  album), 1975
 Mainstream EP, by Metric, 1998
 Mainstream Records, an American record label
 "Mainstream", a song by Thea Gilmore from the 2003 album Avalanche

See also

Mainstreaming (disambiguation)
Mainstream media
Mainline Protestant, a group of American denominations
Mainstream Renewable Power, an Irish renewable energy development company
Mainstream Energy Corporation, an American solar energy company